Retired at 35 is an American sitcom on TV Land starring George Segal, Jessica Walter, Johnathan McClain, Josh McDermitt, Marissa Jaret Winokur, and Ryan Michelle Bathe. It is the network's second original scripted series after Hot in Cleveland. The series premiered on January 19, 2011. On March 21, 2011, the series was renewed for a second season.  The second season premiered on Tuesday, June 26, 2012, at 10:00 pm ET/PT, and concluded on Wednesday, August 29, 2012.

On December 13, 2012, TV Land announced that they were not renewing Retired at 35 for another season and it was cancelled, making it the first TV Land original sitcom to be cancelled from the network.

Premise
The series follows a successful New Yorker named David (Johnathan McClain), who decides to leave the rat race and his job in the big city and visit his father (George Segal) and mother (Jessica Walter) who live in a retirement community in Florida. Hoping to reconnect with them and re-evaluate his life, he makes a snap decision to quit his job and take some time to live the dream of retirement that so many are working toward. But he soon finds, to his surprise, that his parents are in the final stages of separating.

Cast and characters

Main cast
George Segal as Alan Robbins
Johnathan McClain as David Robbins
Jessica Walter as Elaine Robbins
Josh McDermitt as Brandon
Ryan Michelle Bathe as Jessica Sanders (season 1)
Marissa Jaret Winokur as Amy Robbins (season 2)
Casey Wilson played the role of Amy Robbins in the pilot episode, prior to joining the cast of the ABC sitcom Happy Endings

Recurring cast
George Wyner as Richard
Peter Bonerz as Chuckie Lutz
Christine Ebersole as Susan (season 1)
John Ross Bowie as Jared (season 2)
Danneel Ackles as Jenn (season 2)

Guest cast

 Estelle Harris 
 Mimi Kennedy 
 Mark Christopher Lawrence
 Shelley Long
 John O'Hurley
 Christina Pickles
 Jay Thomas
 Ashley Williams 
 Fred Willard 
 Robin Givens
 Melissa Peterman

Episodes

Season 1 (2011)

Season 2 (2012)
Retired at 35 was renewed for a second season of ten episodes, on March 21, 2011. Marissa Jaret Winokur joined the cast as Amy Robbins, David's bubbly sister. The role was previously played by Casey Wilson in the pilot episode. Production on the 10 episodes of season 2 began on November 3, 2011. The new season premiered at 10 PM (EDT) on Tuesday, June 26, 2012. After three episodes aired, TV Land moved the first-run episodes to Wednesdays at 11 PM (EDT).

Production

Development 
TV Land placed a pilot order on October 26, 2009. The series was created by Chris Case, who also serves as executive producer. Michael Hanel and Mindy Schultheis are executive producers, as well. Retired at 35 was ordered to series by TV Land on April 16, 2010. The series, which is TV Land's second original scripted comedy series, premiered on January 19, 2011, following Hot in Cleveland.

Casting 
Casting announcements began in November 2009, with George Segal as the first actor cast, playing the role of Alan Robbins, David's father, who bonds with his son while showing him the glories of his newfound lifestyle. Johnathan McClain, Josh McDermitt, and Ryan Michelle Bathe were the next actors cast, with McClain playing David Robbins, a successful young businessman who decides to leave New York behind and move into his father's Florida retirement home, McDermitt playing Brandon, David's best friend, and Bathe playing Jessica Sanders, David's love interest. The last series regular cast was Jessica Walter as Elaine Robbins, David's mom and Alan's ex-wife. Segal and Walter had previously teamed on Bye Bye Braverman (1968); the two stars would pass away one day apart on March 23 and 24, 2021 respectively. Marissa Jaret Winokur joined the cast in the second season as Amy Robbins, David's sister, a sharp-tongued, quick-witted, successful saleswoman for a pharmaceutical company with a bubbly personality, a role that was originally played by Casey Wilson in the pilot.

Filming 
The series is filmed in multicamera format in front of a live studio audience.

Reception

Ratings

International broadcasting
In Canada, it airs on VisionTV.
In Italy, it airs on Fox Italy; on MNet in South Africa; and on TV4 in Sweden and Finland.
In Latin America, it airs con Comedy Central Latin America Sundays at 11.30PM CT
In The Netherlands, the show was burned off late at night on Dutch network Veronica.

References

External links 

2010s American sitcoms
2011 American television series debuts
2012 American television series endings
English-language television shows
Television shows set in Florida
TV Land original programming
Television series by Endemol